Natural Avenue is the debut solo album by John Lodge of The Moody Blues, released in 1977 during the Moody Blues' five year hiatus. During the five years, Lodge also collaborated with Justin Hayward for an album titled Blue Jays. While Natural Avenue wasn't exactly a hit, the album fared slightly better than Hayward's release of Night Flight three years later. Music critic Robert Hillburn gave the album a favourable review in the Los Angeles Times. The album's cover features artwork by English artist Roger Dean.

The album was originally released on the London label in 1977. It was subsequently re-released on CD on the Threshold label in 1987. This release included one bonus track, "Street Café" (originally released as a single in 1980).

It was released yet again on Threshold in May 1996, with the additional bonus track "Threw It All Away" (the B-side of the "Street Café" single).

Track listing 
All tracks composed by John Lodge

Side 1
"Intro to Children of Rock 'n Roll" – 1:04
"Natural Avenue" – 3:56
"Summer Breeze" – 5:22
"Carry Me" – 5:42
"Who Could Change" – 6:04

Side 2
"Broken Dreams, Hard Road" – 4:33
"Piece of My Heart" – 3:56
"Rainbow" – 3:53
"Say You Love Me" – 6:25
"Children of Rock 'n Roll" – 4:31

1987 CD Bonus Track
<LI>"Street Café" – 4:02

1996/2014 Reissue CD Bonus Tracks
<LI>"Street Café" – 4:02
<LI>"Threw It All Away" – 4:17

"Street Café" produced by Pip Williams"Threw It All Away" produced by Pip Williams

Personnel
John Lodge – 6- and 12-string acoustic guitars (1–7, 9, 10), bass (2–10), harmonica (2), piano (5), vocals
Steve Simpson – Spanish guitar (1, 9), 6-string acoustic guitars (1, 3–6, 10), electric guitar (2, 6), vocals
Kenney Jones – drums & percussion (2–10)
Mick Weaver – piano & organ (2–6, 8–10), electric piano (7), celeste (7)
Mel Collins – soprano saxophone (2)
Martin Dobson – alto saxophone (2)
Jimmy Jewell – saxophone (3, 6)
Brian Rogers Orchestra – (3–10)
Chris Spedding – electric guitar (5, 7–10)
Dennis Lopez – percussion (5)
Gary Osborne – vocals
John Richardson – vocals
Allan Williams – vocals
Billy Lowrie – vocals

Chart positions

References

1977 debut albums
John Lodge (musician) albums
Albums produced by Tony Clarke (producer)
Decca Records albums
Albums recorded at Sunset Sound Recorders
Albums with cover art by Roger Dean (artist)